Congressional Cup is an annual match racing sailing competition and event on the World Match Racing Tour. It is sailed in Catalina 37 yachts.

Winners

References

Sailing competitions in the United States
World Match Racing Tour
Match racing competitions
Recurring sporting events established in 1965
Sailing in California